is a lighthouse on the top of Shima Peninsula in the city of Shima, Mie Prefecture, Japan.

History 
The Anorisaki Lighthouse was designed and constructed by British engineer Richard Henry Brunton and was first lit on April 1, 1873. It is the first lighthouse in Japan to use a rotating Fresnel lens. The octagonal structure was built  of Zelkova serrata wood and had a total height of 10.6 metres.

Brunton constructed 25 lighthouses from far northern Hokkaidō to southern Kyūshū during his career in Japan, each with a different design. Although Anorisaki Lighthouse was the 20th of the 25 built by Brunton, it was the oldest with a wooden construction.

This lighthouse was relocated five meters inland from its original location in 1911 due to coastal erosion. It was electrified in 1932. In 1948, it was replaced by a more modern design, and the original structure designed by Brunton was later relocated to the Museum of Maritime Science in Tokyo.

The modern replacement was completed in August 1948 and is a square ferro-concrete structure with a height of 12.7 metres. The lens was upgraded to a 4th order Fresnel in 1950.

The lighthouse was fully automated and has been unattended since October 1988. From April 29, 2004, it has been open to the public for tours, with a small museum attached containing displays about the filming of the 1957 Japanese movie Times of Joy and Sorrow.

See also 

 List of lighthouses in Japan

References

References 
Brunton, Richard. Building Japan, 1868–1879. Japan Library, 1991. 
Pedlar, Neil. The Imported Pioneers: Westerners who Helped Build Modern Japan. Routledge, 1990.

External links 

 Lighthouses in Japan 
Japan Coast Guard

Lighthouses completed in 1873
Buildings and structures in Mie Prefecture
Lighthouses in Japan
Museums in Mie Prefecture
Lighthouse museums in Japan
Shima, Mie
1873 establishments in Japan